Cheibane Traoré (born 14 December 1990) is a Malian footballer who plays as a forward.

References

External links
 

1990 births
Living people
People from Bamako
Malian footballers
Mali international footballers
Malian expatriate footballers
CS Duguwolofila players
Stade Malien players
TP Mazembe players
RS Berkane players
KAC Kénitra players
ENPPI SC players
Al-Nahda Club (Saudi Arabia) players
Al-Arabi SC (Saudi Arabia) players
Malian Première Division players
Linafoot players
Botola players
Egyptian Premier League players
Saudi First Division League players
Saudi Second Division players
Expatriate footballers in the Republic of the Congo
Expatriate footballers in Morocco
Expatriate footballers in Egypt
Expatriate footballers in Saudi Arabia
Malian expatriate sportspeople in the Democratic Republic of the Congo
Malian expatriate sportspeople in Morocco
Malian expatriate sportspeople in Egypt
Malian expatriate sportspeople in Saudi Arabia
Association football forwards
Place of birth missing (living people)
21st-century Malian people